The Spirit of America is a 1963 American short documentary film produced by Algernon G. Walker about the Spirit of America. It was nominated for an Academy Award for Best Documentary Short.

See also
List of American films of 1963

References

External links
 
The Spirit of America at National Archives and Records Administration

1963 films
1963 documentary films
1963 short films
American short documentary films
1960s short documentary films
1960s English-language films
1960s American films